Rooijakkers is a Dutch surname. Notable people with this surname include:

 Art Rooijakkers (born 1976), Dutch television presenter
 Pauliena Rooijakkers (born 1993), Dutch cyclist
 Piet Rooijakkers (born 1980), Dutch cyclist

Dutch-language surnames